Turkey competed at the 2012 Summer Olympics in London, from 27 July to 12 August 2012. This nation has competed at every Summer Olympic Games in the modern era since its debut in 1908. Turkey, however, did not attend the 1920 Summer Olympics in Antwerp, the 1932 Summer Olympics in Los Angeles at the period of Great Depression, and the 1980 Summer Olympics in Moscow because of its support for the United States boycott. The Turkish Olympic Committee (TMOK) sent the nation's largest delegation to the Games. A total of 114 athletes, 48 men and 66 women, competed in 16 sports. For the first time in its Olympic history, Turkey was represented by more female than male athletes. Women's basketball and women's volleyball were the only team-based sports in which Turkey had its representation in these Olympic games. There was only a single competitor in archery, badminton, and artistic gymnastics.

The Turkish team featured past Olympic medalists, including hammer thrower Eşref Apak, taekwondo jins Bahri Tanrıkulu and Servet Tazegül, who previously won the bronze in Beijing, and freestyle wrestler and defending champion Ramazan Şahin. Backstroke swimmer Derya Büyükuncu became the first Turkish athlete to compete in six Olympic games. Meanwhile, weightlifter and former Olympic record holder Aylin Daşdelen made her Olympic comeback after an eight-year absence. Volleyball player Neslihan Demir Darnel, who led her national team by winning the European qualification tournament, became Turkey's first female flag bearer at the opening ceremony.

Turkey left London with a total of three Olympic medals (each one gold,  silver and  bronze), the lowest in Summer Olympic history since 1988. Two of these medals were awarded to the team in taekwondo and one in wrestling. Among the nation's medalists were the taekwondo jin Servet Tazegül, who won Turkey's first Olympic gold medal in this discipline. For the first time since 1984, Turkey did not win an Olympic medal in weightlifting.

Medalists

| width=78% align=left valign=top |

On 17 August 2015, the Court of Arbitration for Sport says it approved a settlement agreed to by Turkish athlete Aslı Çakır Alptekin and the IAAF. Alptekin has agreed to forfeit her 1500 metres Olympic title and serve an eight-year ban for blood doping. IOC has not yet confirmed the redistribution of the medals in this event.

| width=22% align=left valign=top |

Competitors

Archery

Turkey has qualified one archer for the women's individual event

Athletics 

Turkish athletes have so far achieved qualifying standards in the following athletics events (up to a maximum of 3 athletes in each event at the 'A' Standard, and 1 at the 'B' Standard):

Men
Track & road events

Field events

Women
Track & road events

Field events

Badminton

Basketball 

Turkey has qualified a women's team.
 Women's team event - 1 team of 12 players

Women's tournament

Roster

Group play

Quarter-final

Boxing

Men

Cycling

Road

Gymnastics

Artistic
Women

Judo

Sailing

Men

Women

M = Medal race; EL = Eliminated – did not advance into the medal race;

Shooting

Men

Women

Swimming

Men

Women

Table tennis

Taekwondo

Volleyball

 Women's indoor event – 1 team of 12 players

Women's indoor tournament

Team roster

Group play

Weightlifting

Men

Women

Wrestling 

Men's freestyle

Men's Greco-Roman

Women's freestyle

References

External links
TMOK

Nations at the 2012 Summer Olympics
2012
2012 in Turkish sport